Nikola Dukić (born 10 January 1998) is a Serbian footballer who plays for Žarkovo.

Career
In 2016, Dukić signed for Italian Serie A side Chievo after playing for the youth academy of Partizan, Serbia's most successful club, before being sent on loan to Bari's youth team for the 2017 Torneo di Viareggio.

In 2019, he signed for FK Mačva Šabac in the Serbian top flight.

References

External links
 

1998 births
Living people
Association football defenders
Serbian footballers
Serbian expatriate footballers
Serbia youth international footballers
A.C. ChievoVerona players
FK Mačva Šabac players
FK Voždovac players
OFK Žarkovo players
Serbian SuperLiga players
Serbian First League players
Serbian expatriate sportspeople in Italy
Expatriate footballers in Italy